Mylodontidae is a family of extinct South American and North American ground sloths within the suborder Folivora of order Pilosa, living from around 23 million years ago (Mya) to 11,000 years ago. This family is most closely related to another family of extinct ground sloths, Scelidotheriidae, as well as to the extant arboreal two-toed sloths, family Choloepodidae; together these make up the superfamily Mylodontoidea. Phylogenetic analyses based on morphology uncovered the relationship between Mylodontidae and Scelidotheriidae; in fact, the latter was for a time considered a subfamily of mylodontids. However, molecular sequence comparisons were needed for the correct placement of Choloepodidae. These studies have been carried out using mitochondrial DNA sequences as well as with collagen amino acid sequences. The latter results indicate that Choloepodidae is closer to Mylodontidae than Scelidotheriidae is. The only other living sloth family, Bradypodidae (three-toed sloths), belongs to a different sloth radiation, Megatherioidea.

The mylodontoids form one of three major radiations of sloths. The discovery of their fossils in caverns associated with human occupation lead some early researchers to theorize that the early humans built corrals when they could procure a young ground sloth, to raise the animal to butchering size. However, radiocarbon dates do not support simultaneous occupation of the site by humans and sloths. Subfossil remains like coproliths, fur and skin have been discovered in some quantities.

Phylogeny 
The following sloth family phylogenetic tree is based on collagen and mitochondrial DNA sequence data (see Fig. 4 of Presslee et al., 2019).

References

Bibliography 
Woodward, A.S. (1900): On some remains of Grypotherium (Neomylodon) listai and associated mammals from a cavern near Consuelo Cove, Last Hope Inlet.  Proceedings of the Zoological Society of London, 1900(5): 64-79.

Further reading 
 
Cuvier, G. (1796): Notice sur le squellette d'une très grande espèce de quadrupède inconnue jusqu'à présent, trouvé au Paraquay, et déposé au cabinet d'histoire naturelle de Madrid.  Magasin encyopédique, ou Journal des Sciences, des Lettres et des Arts (1): 303-310; (2): 227-228.
De Iuliis, G. & Cartelle, C. (1999): A new giant megatheriine ground sloth (Mammalia: Xenarthra: Megatheriidae) from the late Blancan to early Irvingtonian of Florida. Zool. J. Linn. Soc. 127(4): 495-515.
  (1993): Yukon Beringia Interpretive Center - Jefferson's Ground Sloth. Retrieved 2008-JAN-24.
Hogan, C.M. (2008): Cueva del Milodon, Megalithic Portal. Retrieved 2008-APR-13
  (1980): Pleistocene Mammals of North America. Columbia University Press, New York. 
McKenna, Malcolm C. & Bell, Susan K. (1997): Classification of Mammals Above the Species Level. Columbia University Press, New York. 
Nowak, R.M. (1999): Walker's Mammals of the World (Vol. 2). Johns Hopkins University Press, London.
White, J.L. (1993): Indicators of locomotor habits in Xenarthrans: Evidence for locomotor heterogeneity among fossil sloths.  Journal of Vertebrate Paleontology, 13(2): 230-242.

External links 

 Sloth World: An Online Sloth Bibliography
 Picture and information about a ground sloth skeleton on display at the University of Georgia's Science Library
 Academy of Natural Sciences ground sloth page
 Illinois State Museum ground sloth page
 Ground sloths at La Brea
 Eremotherium in Florida
 Have some ground sloths survived in Argentina?
 Ground sloths in general
 Western Center for Archaeology and Paleontology Hemet, CA

 
 
 
 
 
Neogene mammals of South America
Quaternary mammals of South America
Rupelian first appearances
Holocene extinctions
Prehistoric mammal families
Taxa named by Florentino Ameghino